Seguenzia monocingulata is an extinct species of sea snail, a marine gastropod mollusk in the family Seguenziidae. It resembles Seguenzia formosa and has been regarded as a synonym of that (extant) species. However the two species are distinct, based on shell morphology.

Description
The height of the shell attains 4 mm. The white, imperforate shell has a high conoid shape. The whorls have revolving ribs, of which the last has about four distant prominent ones, besides minor striae on the base.

Distribution
This species was originally described by Seguenza from Pliocene fossils found at Torrente Trapani, a locality of the city of Messina, Sicily. It is common in deep-sea deposits from southern Italy.

References

External links
 

monocingulata
Gastropods described in 1876
Prehistoric gastropods